Asaduzzaman Noor (born 8 August 1991 in Gopalganj, Bangladesh), better known as Asad Noor, is an exiled Bangladeshi blogger and human rights activist. Noor is an advocate for freedom of expression and LGBT rights, who has criticised religious fundamentalism in Bangladesh. He has been prosecuted multiple times by Bangladeshi authorities for alleged blasphemy and hurting religious sentiments. He has been living in exile in India since 2019.

Life

Activism 
Noor began his activism by writing to various blogs and social networks in 2013. Following his involvement with the 2013 Shahbag protests, he became a target for religious fundamentalists. Since 2015, he has been subjected to threats and intimidation by state and non-state actors for his human rights work.

In July 2020, Noor published several video blogs condemning the intimidation of Bangladesh's minority Buddhist community in Rangunia Upazila of the Chittagong District.  Consequently, a local Awami League leader filed a lawsuit against Noor on 14 July 2020 under the Digital Security Act, with the charges of "hurting religious sentiments" and "running propaganda against the spirit of the liberation war."

One of Noor's video blogs presented the apparent vandalism of an under-construction Buddhist statue of a Buddhist monastery in Rangunia. Noor claimed the attackers were backed by the forest officials and the local Awami League MP because they conspired to banish the monks from the area. Following the release of Noor's videos, local Islamic groups protested against the blogger and accused him of undermining religious harmony between Muslims and Buddhists.

ICT Act Case and arrest

On 25 December 2017, Noor was arrested by the immigration police of Shahjalal International Airport while trying to flee Bangladesh and was later sent to jail.

8 months imprisonment, release on bail and re-arrest

Subsequently, Noor spent eight months in prison throughout 2018. In August, as he was released on bail, he faced protests from the radical Islamist group Hefazat-e-Islam Bangladesh, who demanded him to be executed. Noor was later arrested for alleged involvement in a drug trafficking case, which he claims is a fabrication.

Escape from Bangladesh 
In early 2019, Noor was granted bail for the second time. Fearing for his safety after his release, Noor secretly fled Bangladesh in February. He has been living underground outside Bangladesh ever since and continues his online activism on Facebook and YouTube.

Harassment of his family members 
On 18 July 2020, plainclothes policemen picked up six of Noor's family members from his hometown of Amtali in Barguna district. They were taken to Amtali police station, where his father was forced to call Noor and ask him to remove all video posts from his Facebook page, leading international human rights organizations like Human Rights Watch, Amnesty International, Asian Human Rights Commission and Robert F. Kennedy Human Rights to raise their concern about the incident.

Reactions
Karin Deutsch Karlekar, Director of Free Expression at Risk Programs at PEN America said: “The arrest and detention of Asad Noor reflects the extremely precarious position of independent voices in Bangladesh”. Karlekar also added: “Bloggers like Noor live in fear of physical attack or even murder from extremist groups on the one hand, and then face persecution from their government—which should be acting to protect them—on the other. We ask Bangladeshi officials to release and drop the charges against Asad Noor, to take robust measures to protect him from extremist violence, and in addition, to protect, rather than prosecute, free expression.”

Daniel Bastard, head of RSF Reporters without Borders Asia-Pacific stated: “We call for the charges against Asad Noor to be dismissed because his only crime has been to express secular opinions,” and added “The legal article under which he is accused has for too long been used by extremist religious groups to gag all independent voices. And, in view of the calls for his death, the authorities must provide him with specific protective measures.”

Sultan Mohammed Zakaria, a researcher on South Asia at Amnesty International, has stated that “the harassment of Asad’s family is not an isolated incident. It is part of a worrying pattern targeting families of human rights defenders in exile,” he also added “The harassment of families, to muzzle human rights defenders in exile from Bangladesh, is utterly reprehensible. Such tactics of intimidation must be stopped immediately.”

UN Special rapporteur on Freedom of Religion or Belief Ahmed Shaheed said: “We express grave concern at the alleged persecution and prosecution of Mr. Noor, for the exercise of his human rights to freedom of thought, conscience, religion or belief, opinion and expression.”

In 2021, during a General Debate at the 46th Session of the UN Human Rights Council, Humanists International's Advocacy Officer Lillie Ashworth raised the issue of Asad Noor's persecution and demanded justice for him. She also expressed her concerns about the harassment of Noor's family members by Bangladeshi law enforcement agencies and reminded Bangladesh of its ‘moral and legal obligation’ to protect the rights of human rights activists.

References

Living people
1991 births
Bangladeshi emigrants to India
Bangladeshi secularists
Bangladeshi human rights activists
Bangladeshi atheists
People from Gopalganj District, Bangladesh